Jeff "Ox" Kargola (November 29, 1983 – April 29, 2011) was an American professional freestyle motocross (FMX) rider. He was a member of the Metal mulisha FMX team.

His career was highlighted by a silver medal in the Men's Best Trick competition at the 2005 Winter X Games.

Kargola died on April 29, 2011, aged 27, after sustaining a head injury and internal bleeding on the second day of the Desert Assassins' Rip to the Tip motocross event in Baja California, Mexico.

X Games competition history

References 

1983 births
2011 deaths
Freestyle motocross riders
X Games athletes
Sport deaths in Mexico
People from San Clemente, California
Place of birth missing
Motorcycle racers who died while racing